Clepsis moeschleriana is a species of moth of the family Tortricidae first described by Maximilian Ferdinand Wocke in 1862. It is found in Kyrgyzstan, Russia and North America, where it has been recorded from Alaska to Newfoundland, south in the mountains to New Hampshire, Colorado and Utah. The habitat consists of alpine and subalpine areas.

The wingspan is 15–23 mm. The forewings vary from pale white to reddish brown. The hindwings vary from off white to grey. Adults have been recorded on wing from May to June in Russia and from June to August in North America.

The larvae feed on Delphinium barbeyi.

References

Moths described in 1862
Clepsis